|-
!align=center style=background:#CEE0F2 | Seniors
|-

|-

|-
!align=center style=background:#CEE0F2 | Juniors
|-

|-

|-
!align=center style=background:#CEE0F2 | Juniors
|-

The Finland national ringette team,, more commonly known as "Team Finland", is the ringette team representing Finland internationally. Finland has both a senior national team, Team Finland Senior, and a junior national team, Team Finland Junior. Both national teams compete in the World Ringette Championships (WRC) and are overseen by Ringette Finland, which is a member of the International Ringette Federation (IRF). Finland's first appearance in international ringette took place at the first World Ringette Championships in 1990.

Team Finland and Team Canada have emerged as ringette's major international rivals at both the senior and junior level. Historically, Team Finland Senior dominates the Senior Pool, while Team Canada Junior dominates the Junior Pool.

⁣⁣ was the head coach of the senior national team from March 2011 to 2020 after which Pasi Kataja was chosen to become the team's next head coach. Kataja was previously the coach of the Finnish senior national ringette team from 2003–2006 and the head coach of the junior national team from 1999–2002.

History
Finland's first appearance in international ringette took place at the 1990 World Ringette Championships which was the inaugural year for the World Ringette Championships (WRC). One Finland senior amateur ringette team represented the country, "Team Finland", while the Canadians sent six different Canadian teams to compete. Since the 1990 WRC, a single amateur national Finland team has served as the country's senior representative, with Team Finland Senior eventually competing against Team Canada Senior in the 1998 Summit Series.

The 2009 World Junior Ringette Championships was the first ringette tournament where an international competition took place specifically for junior players between ringette playing nations. Team Finland Junior (U19) is Finland's junior representative. Today junior national ringette teams compete in the Junior Pool at the World Ringette Championships after the junior tournament merged with the larger senior program in 2013.

World Championship record

Summit Series
The 1998 World Ringette Championships were replaced by a Summit Series between Team Canada and Team Finland, both of which were senior teams. Team Finland finished in first place defeating Team Canada.

Senior Finland

Junior Finland

Team Finland Senior
Team Finland Senior's first appearance in international ringette took place at the first World Ringette Championships in 1990 in Gloucester, Ontario. However, the team was initially known only as "Team Finland" until the addition of the junior level at the World Ringette Championships in 2013, after which it has been known as Team Finland Senior. Having competed at every World Championships since, they have won nine of the fourteen events, marking them as the most successful national ringette side by far.

Team Finland Junior

The World Junior Ringette Championship tournament was created separately from the major competition between senior national teams (the World Ringette Championships) and was established in 2009 by the International Ringette Federation. At the 2009 World Junior Ringette Championships, Finland was represented by two U19 (Under–19) teams, the Finland White Stars and the Finland Blue Stars.

For the next World Junior Ringette Championships, the 2012 World Junior Ringette Championships, Finland sent only one Finland junior amateur ringette team, Team Finland U19. While Finland had formed its first all-junior Finland national ringette team in 2012, its arch-rival, Canada, did not form its first all-junior Canadian national ringette team until 2013. However, by 2013, the Junior tournament was officially merged with the World Ringette Championship and ceased as a separate event. From WRC 2013 onward, all competing ringette nations with Junior national ringette teams compete in the World Ringette Championships program along with Senior national teams but did so in a separate Junior Pool, currently dominated by Team Canada. Team Finland Junior and Team Canada Junior compete in a best-of-three series with the winner of the world ringette junior title also hoisting the Juuso Wahlsten Trophy.

Notable people

Players
  (née Kyhälä)
 ⁣⁣⁣ - Marjukka Virta (now retired as a player) won seven World Ringette Championship gold medals for Team Finland (Senior) with six of them as the national team's captain. Virta's game number 4 was frozen on November 1 in Turku by The Finnish ringette association, Ringette Finland. Virta is the first Finnish ringette player in history to have been given this honour.
 ⁣⁣
 Susanna Tapani⁣⁣
 
 
 
 Anna Vanhatalo
 
 
 
  – Vaarakallio won the 1992 World Ringette Championships bronze. She stopped playing ringette after receiving a six-month suspension for kicking an opponent who was lying on the ice.

Juuso Wahlsten
Juhani Jorma Kalevi Wahlsten,  Juuso Wahlsten, is called "The Father of Finnish Ringette" and was responsible for introducing ringette to Finland in 1979. The World Ringette Championships junior trophy has been named in his honour, the Juuso Wahlsten Trophy. Wahlsten also competed in the Winter Olympics as a member of the Finland men's national ice hockey team and was inducted into the IIHF Hall of Fame.

Timo Himberg

⁣⁣

Gallery

See also

 Ringette
 World Ringette Championships
  Canada national ringette team
  United States national ringette team
  Sweden national ringette team
  Czech Republic national ringette team
 International Ringette Federation
 Sam Jacks
 Juhani "Juuso" Wahlsten

References

External links
 International Ringette Federation
 The History of Ringette in Calgary
  Ringette Canada
    Ringette Finland
   Team USA Ringette
    Sweden Ringette Association
   Ringette Slovakia
   Czech Ringette

Ringette
National ringette teams
Ringette
Ringette
Ringette players